The Music School Kosta Manojlovic is located at 9 Nemanjina street in Zemun. It is one of the largest schools in Serbia.
 The school was named after Kosta Manojlovic, the famous Serbian composer, musicologist, founder and first rector of the Faculty of Music in Belgrade. Students and professors of this school have achieved outstanding successes at numerous competition events in Serbia and abroad, which places the school at the very top of the music education in Serbia. The School Day is celebrated on December 4 – the day of birth of Kosta Manojlovic.

History of school 
The Music School Kosta Manojlovic started its work on September 1, 1939, as a separate department of the Music School Stanković in Belgrade. This was done "to facilitate the Zemun students attend music school."

Teaching was first held on the first floor in a private three-room apartment (facing the street), a hallway and utility rooms, at 23 St. Sava Street in Zemun, under modest and difficult conditions. Conducting the department was entrusted to Dr. Ljudevit Kiš (Sombor 1900 – Budapest 1982), an experienced and high-quality music pedagogue, who taught piano at the school. This exceptional musician was also the first headmaster of the school. In the first academic year (1939/1940), there were 42 students (29 pianists, 10 violinists, 1 cellist and 2 solo singers.)

In 1949 the school received a status of a regular six-year school, and in 1954 on a proposal of a part-time professor of flute Vojislav Voki Kostic, the school was renamed to Kosta Manojlovic.

The school received a few rooms in the building of the Cultural Center, the site of today's Sports Hall "Pinki" in 1957. It then became a significant factor in the cultural life of Zemun and in 1961 it was the organizer of the famous concerts that had a common name Zemun music evenings. Domestic and foreign well-known artists of classical music had performed there.

In 1970 the House of Culture was pulled down for the sake of construction of the Sports Hall (today Pinki). A new location was obtained and the present school building was constructed. It started to work on February 6, 1971.

Thanks to the high professional level, outstanding results and generous engagement of the school employees, the conditions for the opening of secondary school were fulfilled, and on December 1, 1979, the department of the high school first grade was enlisted. Two years later, in 1981, the special Music Department at the School for Visually Impaired Pupils Veljko Ramadanovic was merged to the Kosta Manojlovic school. This is the only modern equipped school in the territory of Serbia that has software and a printer for printing notes in Braille for visually impaired and blind children. 
Today this department provides education to students of:
 pianos
 violin
 guitar
 accordions
 oboe
 clarinet
 saxophone

Three educational cycles of the Music School Kosta Manojlovic 
1. Pre-school education
- musical nursery
- musical kindergarten
- the preparatory preschool program
2. Elementary music education and
3. Secondary music education

Seven Departments of the school 
Musical education is carried out in 7 departments for:
 the piano
 string instruments
 wind instruments
 solo singing
 the accordion
 the guitar and
 music production and sound recording.

 The Music School "Kosta Manojlovic" is a unique high school institution which has, since 2004, educated students for Sound designers, profiles that are scarce in our country. For these purposes, the school possesses a professional Sound Studio with computers and all the necessary supporting equipment. The studio is connected to the concert hall, which gives tremendous opportunities for recording documents for educational and publishing purposes.

Societies acting at the school 
Under the auspices of the school the following societies are acting:
 Frédéric Chopin for Serbia
 Legacy of Miodrag Azanjac
 Flute Association of Serbia Miodrag Azanjac

Headmasters of the school since its opening until today

Former students of the school 
Many former students of the school are now renowned artists. Let's just mention some of them:
 Grujica Paunović, solo-singer. He was a member of the  Belgrade Opera. He lives and works in Zurich as a chorister of the Zurich Opera, frequently organizing solo concerts in Zurich.
 Franja Buca Jenč, jazz musician, trumpeter, composer and arranger. A member of the Ensemble Entertainment RTB. pianist, world-renowned concert performer.
 Aleksandar Serdar, pianist, world-renowned concert performer. He has won many first prizes at significant international competitions. He has had astonishing concert activities in the most prestigious halls around the world and held master classes in Nice, Israel, and Orléans. Professor at the Faculty of Music in Belgrade.
 Ivan Tomašev, solo-singer. He worked 2 years in the Novi Sad Opera House, and then has become the first bass in Belgrade Opera.
 Jasmina Trumbetaš, solo-singer. She is now one of the leading sopranos in the Belgrade Opera.
 Bojan Zulfikarpašić, known as Bojan Z, world-renowned jazz musician and pianist. Winner of numerous international awards, in 2005 he was selected the best European jazz artist. He played on all important international festivals. He lives and works in Paris, where he teaches, and also acts as a visiting professor at the jazz department of FMU in Belgrade.
 Stefan Milenković, our famous violinist. He has won many prizes and awards at major international competitions. In addition to numerous concert tours, he has devoted himself to pedagogical work with students. He teaches at the Juilliard Delay Institute. 
 Marko Josifoski, our famous violinist. He studied in Bern. He has won many awards both at home and abroad. He has performed in concert halls of almost all European countries. The assistant at the AU in Novi Sad. 
 Miloš Petrović, violinist. He has won numerous prizes and awards at festivals and competitions at home and abroad. He has held many concerts in Serbia and abroad. An assistant professor and head of the string department at the Faculty of Philology and Arts, University of Kragujevac.
 Nemanja Radulović, our famous violinist, an exceptional musical talent who has got a perfect pitch. He studied in Belgrade and Paris. He has performed at a surprising number of concerts in many cities of Europe and America.
 Maja Bogdanović, cellist. She studied in Paris. She has performed at many concerts at home and abroad and won a great number of national and international awards and recognitions.
 Lidija Bizjak, pianist. She studied in Paris. She completed postgraduate studies at the Faculty of Music in Belgrade. She has won many national and international awards and recognitions. She has performed a lot at home and abroad.
 Željko Lazić, clarinetist. He studied in Belgrade and Sydney. Works as a composer and music producer in Taipei and Sydney. He has won many national and international awards and recognitions.
 Sanja Bizjak, pianist. She studied at the prestigious Conservatory of Paris in a shortened period of time. The winner of many international competitions. She has performed in many major European concert halls.
 Vesna Šouc, conductor. She works as an assistant professor at the Faculty of Music in Belgrade. Vesna has conducted almost all symphony orchestras of our big cities. She has also won many awards and recognitions.
 David Bižić, solo singer. He performs as a baritone in leading world houses such as the Paris Opera, the Royal Opera House in London (Covent Garden), the Berlin Opera, the Metropolitan Opera, the Royal Opera Madrid, Royal Swedish Opera, Bolshoi Theatre in Moscow.

School professors as music textbook authors and publishers 
Here is a list of the professors who have worked hard, since the founding of the school to the present day, on creating educational instructive musical literature, contributing to the enrichment of the educational process of their instrument, and thus ensuring the necessary literature for the work.

 Milivoje Ivanovic, a professor of violin. He has published more than 200 titles and thereby alleviated the shortage of musical material for many years, which made it difficult to work in music schools.
 Dejan Marković, a professor of violin and former headmaster of the school. He wrote and published five books for his instrument. They are still used in schools for teaching the violin.
 Radivoj Lazić, a professor of clarinet. He has written about 30 books for clarinet and published 23. Four schools for clarinet and many collections of pieces are abundantly used for teaching, and pieces themselves on the concert stages, as well as at national and international competitions of clarinetists. Pieces of Radivoj Lazic have been performed worldwide. Piano accompaniment and orchestration was done by the composer and professor Vlastimir Pericic.
 Zoran Rakic, a professor of the accordion. He has written six books for the accordion and the Collection of etudes for secondary music school, which have been very well accepted by colleagues.
 Zoran Milenkovic, a professor of violin. Occasionally he used to give his instructive compositions for the violin to his students to play them. It is not known whether they were published.

References

External links

See also 
 Kosta Manojlović
 Music Academy in Belgrade
 Music schools in Serbia
 Elementary music school
 Sound recording and reproduction
 Audio engineer

Zemun
Music schools in Serbia